The 2009–10 Dutch Basketball League (DBL) was the 50th season of the Dutch Basketball League, the highest professional basketball league in the Netherlands. GasTerra Flames dominated throughout the regular season and lost just three games. Zorg en Zekerheid Leiden player Danny Gibson was league top scorer and won the Most Valuable Player award. GasTerra Flames eventually won its third title in team history, by beating World Class Aviation Academy Giants 4–1 in the playoff finals.

It was the first year the league was named the Dutch Basketball League (DBL), after previously being known as the Eredivisie.

Teams

Regular season

Playoffs 

The playoffs started on 22 April and ended 25 May 2010. The winner of the playoffs was crowned Dutch national champion. In the quarterfinals a best-of-three format is used, while in the semifinals and finals are played in respectively a best-of-five format and best-of-seven format. The higher seeded team had home advantage and played games one, three, five and seven (if possible) at home. Small bold numbers indicate team seeding.

Source: Eurobasket

Statistical leaders

Awards 
Most Valuable Player
  Danny Gibson  (Zorg en Zekerheid Leiden) 
All-Star Team
  Danny Gibson  (Zorg en Zekerheid Leiden) 
  Ronny LeMelle  (Zorg en Zekerheid Leiden) 
  Kees Akerboom, Jr.  (EiffelTowers Den Bosch) 
  Patrick Hilliman  (Rotterdam Challengers) 
  Matt Haryasz  (GasTerra Flames) 
Rookie of the Year
  Mohamed Kherrazi  (ABC Amsterdam) 
Coach of the Year
  Toon van Helfteren  (Zorg en Zekerheid Leiden) 
Statistical Player of the Year
  Elijah Palmer  (Upstairs Weert)

In European competitions

References 

Dutch Basketball League seasons
1
Netherlands